Mert Miraç Altıntaş (born 13 November 2001), is a Turkish professional footballer who plays as a winger for Yeni Malatyaspor.

Professional career
Altıntaş began his senior career with Hekimoğlu Trabzon and immediately went on loan with Yomraspor, where he scored 13 goals in 34 games in his first senior season. He transferred to Yeni Malatyaspor on 5 August 2021. He made his professional debut with Yeni Malatyaspor in a 5–1 Süper Lig loss to Trabzonspor on 16 August 2021.

References

External links
 
 Mackolik Profile

2001 births
Living people
Sportspeople from Trabzon
Turkish footballers
Yeni Malatyaspor footballers
Süper Lig players
Association football wingers